Gustavo Ariosa is a paralympic athlete from Cuba competing mainly in category F54 throwing events.

Gustavo competed in the 1992 Summer Paralympics as a THW5 athlete in the three throwing events winning a bronze in the javelin.  After missing the 1996 games, Gustavo returned for the 2000 Summer Paralympics to again compete in all three throws but this time in the F54 category, winning a second bronze in discua and a silver in the javelin.

References

Paralympic athletes of Cuba
Athletes (track and field) at the 2000 Summer Paralympics
Paralympic silver medalists for Cuba
Paralympic bronze medalists for Cuba
Living people
Medalists at the 1992 Summer Paralympics
Medalists at the 2000 Summer Paralympics
Athletes (track and field) at the 1992 Summer Paralympics
Year of birth missing (living people)
Paralympic medalists in athletics (track and field)
Cuban male discus throwers
Cuban male javelin throwers
Wheelchair discus throwers
Wheelchair javelin throwers
Paralympic discus throwers
Paralympic javelin throwers
21st-century Cuban people